Osama "Ussem" Zoghlami (born 19 June 1994) is a Tunisian-born Italian male middle-distance runner and steeplechaser. He competed at the 2020 Summer Olympics, in 3000 m steeplechase.

He has a twin, also an athlete, named Ala.

Biography
At the Golden Gala 2019 he obtained the IAAF standard for participating in the 2019 World Championships.

Personal best
3000 m steeplechase: 8:11.00 -  Rome, Golden Gala, 09 June 2022

Achievements

See also
 Italian all-time top lists - 3000 metres steeplechase
 Naturalized athletes of Italy

References

External links

1994 births
Living people
Italian male cross country runners
Italian male middle-distance runners
Italian male steeplechase runners
Italian twins
Tunisian twins
Twin sportspeople
Tunisian emigrants to Italy
Italian Athletics Championships winners
Italian sportspeople of African descent
Athletes (track and field) at the 2020 Summer Olympics
Olympic athletes of Italy
European Athletics Championships medalists